The 2012 OFC Champions League Final was the final of the 2011–12 OFC Champions League, the 11th season of the Oceania Cup, Oceania's premier club football tournament organized by the Oceania Football Confederation (OFC), and the 6th season under the current name of the OFC Champions League (also known as O-League).

The final was played over two legs between Tefana from Tahiti and Auckland City from New Zealand, on 29 April and 12 May 2012. After winning the first leg 2–1, Auckland City also won the second leg 1–0 to complete a 3–1 aggregate win. As the OFC Champions League winners, they qualified for the 2012 FIFA Club World Cup as the OFC representative, entering the qualifying play-off round.

Background

Auckland City were the defending champions, winning the title in 2010–11 after beating Amicale in the 2011 OFC Champions League Final. They also won two other finals in 2009 and 2006.

Tefana finished fourth in the group stage in the previous season. They became the second Tahitian side to reach an Oceanian club final, after Pirae in 2006 where they lost to Auckland City.

Road to final

Rules
The winners of the two groups played in the final over two legs, with the order of matches decided by a random draw. The away goals rule applied, with extra time and a penalty shootout used to decide the winner if necessary.

Match summary

First leg

Second leg

References

External links
OFC Champions League

OFC Champions League finals